Greenspoon is a surname. Notable people with the surname include:

Danny Greenspoon, Canadian music producer, music engineer, guitar player, and film composer
Jimmy Greenspoon (1948–2015), American keyboardist and composer
Noah Greenspoon, lay name of Yuttadhammo Bhikkhu, Canadian Buddhist monk

See also
Greenspun, Grinspun 
Greenspan
Grünspan

Jewish surnames
Yiddish-language surnames